The 2014 season for the  cycling team began in February at the Gran Premio della Costa Etruschi. Bardiani–CSF is an Italian-registered UCI Professional Continental cycling team that participated in road bicycle racing events on the UCI Continental Circuits and when selected as a wildcard to UCI ProTour events.

2014 roster

Riders who joined the team for the 2014 season

Riders who left the team during or after the 2013 season

Season victories

Footnotes

References

2014 road cycling season by team